"Little Sadie" is a 20th-century American folk ballad written in Dorian mode. It is also known variously as "Bad Lee Brown", "Cocaine Blues", "Transfusion Blues", "East St. Louis Blues", "Late One Night", "Penitentiary Blues" and other titles. It tells the story of a man who is apprehended after shooting a woman, in some versions his wife or girlfriend. He is then sentenced by a judge.

Earliest transcription
The earliest written record of the song dates from 1922. This lyric fragment, transcribed in Joplin, Missouri, is noted in the 1948 book Ozark Folksongs, Vol. II.

"Bad Lee Brown"

Last night I was a-makin' my rounds,
Met my old woman an' I blowed her down,
I went on home to go to bed,
Put my old cannon right under my head.

Jury says murder in the first degree,
I says oh Lord, have mercy on me!
Old Judge White picks up his pen,
Says you'll never kill no woman ag'in.

Carolina to Mexico
Some versions refer to the Sheriff of Thomasville, North Carolina apprehending the murderer "down in" Jericho, South Carolina (a large rice plantation in the lowlands). Other versions transpose Mexico (or Juarez, Mexico) for Jericho.

Clarence Ashley's recording
In the first sound recording (the 1929 recording by Clarence Ashley), Little Sadie may have been a prostitute:

I woke next morning 'bout half past nine,
The buggies and the hacks all formed in line,
The gents and the gamblers all standing around,
They're gonna take Sadie to the burying ground.

The most common version in country and rock is attributed to T. J. 'Red' Arnall's 1947 Western Swing recording with W. A. Nichol's Western Aces. This version was covered by Johnny Cash, The Grateful Dead, Crooked Still, Doc Watson, and George Thorogood, among others. The 1970 Bob Dylan versions are taken from either of Clarence Ashley's recordings.

"Little Sadie" may have been an influence on the 1960s song "Hey Joe".

Selected list of recorded versions
1929 Bad Lee Brown [unissued] - John Dilleshaw & The String Marvel (OKeh 402406-B)
1929 Little Sadie - Clarence Ashley (Columbia 15522-D)
1939 Bad Man Ballad - Willie Rayford, recorded at Cummins State Farm, near Varner, Arkansas by John Lomax and Ruby Lomax
1946-1948 Whisky Blues - Slim Dusty - Regal Zonophone Collection - Slim Dusty (8142472) Very rare.  Exact date is not known.
1948 Cocaine Blues - Roy Hogsed, US Country #15.  Music/lyrics attributed to T. J. 'Red' Arnall
1940s Chain Gang Blues - Riley Puckett
1940s Bad Lee Brown - Woody Guthrie and Cisco Houston
1959 Badman Ballad - Cisco Houston The Cisco Special! album
1960 Transfusion Blues - Johnny Cash Now, There Was A Song album, and on 1968 album At Folsom Prison. 
1960 Bad Man's Blunder - The Kingston Trio String Along album
1960 Whiskey Blues - Slim Dusty Songs for Rolling Stones album
1968 Cocaine Blues - Johnny Cash At Folsom Prison album
1970 Little Sadie "Trees" (trees folk band) Recorded 1970  On the shore  album  Trees  Folk rock, Genre: psychedelic folk, progressive folk, progressive rock
1970 In Search of Little Sadie and Little Sadie - Bob Dylan Self Portrait album
1970 Little Sadie - Doc Watson Doc Watson on Stage (Vanguard VSD 9/10)
1972 Little Sadie - John Renbourn Faro Annie (Reprise MS2082)
1978 Cocaine Blues - George Thorogood & The Destroyers
1979 Little Sadie - Tony Rice Unit, Manzanita album
1993 Little Sadie - Jerry Garcia, David Grisman and Tony Rice, The Pizza Tapes
1996 Little Sadie - Freight Hoppers Where'd You Come From, Where'd You Go? album
1998 Little Sadie - The Sadies Precious Moments album
1999 Little Sadie - Mark Lanegan I'll Take Care of You album
2001 Little Sadie - Old Crow Medicine Show - The Troubles Up and Down the Road EP
2004 Little Sadie - The Radiators - Earth vs. The Radiators: the First 25 Live DVD
2005 Little Sadie - John Doyle - "Wayward Son"
2006 Little Sadie - Crooked Still - Shaken by A Low Sound album; featured in The Last of Us Part II trailer presented at E3 2018, and also in the final game.
2006 Little Sadie - Greg Graffin - Cold as the Clay album.
2011 Little Sadie/White-Wheeled Limousine/Just One More - Bruce Hornsby and the Noisemakers "Bride of the Noisemakers" album
2013 Little Sadie - Tim Timebomb

References

Other sources
 Roud Folk Song Index 780
 Laws Ballad Index I8
 The Traditional Ballad Index LI08
 Lyle Lofgren "Remembering The Old Songs: Little Sadie" Inside Bluegrass, January 2002
Little Sadie by The Rosinators - lyrics, song history and tab links
 Miller Jr., E. John; & Michael Cromie Folk Guitar, Quadrangle, (1968), p109
 Sing Out! Reprints, Sing Out, (196?), 9, p35
 Bailey, Hobart. Rosenbaum, Art Old-Time Mountain Banjo'', Oak, (1968), p56

1930 songs
Bob Dylan songs
Woody Guthrie songs
Murder ballads